Yahya Butt (1961/1962 – 6 February 2022) was a leading bodybuilder in Pakistan. He won the Asian Gold Medal three times. He was also the chairman of Punjab Bodybuilding Association. Butt succumbed to bowel cancer and died on 6 February 2022 at a local hospital in Lahore.

Butt had won the Mr. Pakistan Olympia title five times and represented Pakistan four times in the Mr. Universe competitions. Butt won the Mr. Asia title in 1994. Yahya Butt was also a Certified Trainer from Gold's Gym California, USA. He was a police officer in the Punjab Police. Yahya had retired to divert his attention to bodybuilding. He ran his own gym and ran a sports manufacturing company to manufacture gym equipment.

Personal life and death 
Butt died on 6 February 2022 at a local hospital in Lahore. He contracted COVID-19 in 2020 and, after recovering from it, was diagnosed with colon cancer.

Provincial Sports Minister Rai Taimoor Khan expressed grief over his demise and said that Yahya Butt's bodybuilding services could never be forgotten.

See also

References 

1960s births
2022 deaths
Year of birth uncertain
Pakistani bodybuilders
People from Lahore